Joan Kelly (1828–1898) was a poet and hand-sewer who published her "Miscellaneous Poems" on 1 January 1884 in the hope of raising sufficient funds to be able to leave the Cunninghame Combination Poorhouse.

Life and character
Joan was born in Irvine and never married, living with her widowed mother Mary Allan in Bridgegate and later in the High Street. It is not known when or how her father died, although one of her poems implies that it was at sea whilst her mother was pregnant. She was employed as a muslin hand-sewer. Joan took an active interest in local and world events, writing poetry on these themes. Her mother, Mary Allan (born circa 1786), died in 1870 aged 84. Her father was John Kelly (born circa 1785), a sailor from the Isle of Man where the couple had been married at Onchan or in Manx, Kione Droghad near Douglas Doolish (Manx) on 16 May 1816. Joan's grandparents on her mother's side of the family were Robert Allan and Grace Sharp.  

Joan died on 4 October 1898 of 'senile debility' aged 70 in the Cunninghame Combination Poorhouse, an establishment to which she had been admitted and discharged on several occasions after her mother's death in 1870. She spent much her later life in the local 'poorhouse' due to being blind or partially sighted.

Some confusion exists as to her date and place of birth, her obituary in "The Glasgow Herald", 10 October 1898 states that she was a native of the Isle of Man, and that she died aged about 80 years of age, whilst as stated her death certificate states 70 years of age.

In 1881 she was listed in the census as a pauper, aged 58 and living at the poorhouse. Her age is in conflict with that given on her death certificate. A handwritten 53 may have been read as 58.

In 1895 the Irvine Parish Role of Paupers gives her age as 76 which is in conflict with her death certificate and records that she had entered the poorhouse in 1870 as a result of 'Impaired Vision' after her mother had died.

Joan died a pauper and as she appears to have had no relatives she would have been buried in the cemetery at the workhouse, however James Dickie, Club Secretary and Town Clerk, as well as the other directors of the Irvine Burns Club recognised her talents as a poet and organised and paid for her burial at the Irvine churchyard,  preceded by a procession of the club members, magistrates, the Incorporated  Trades, council officials and members of the public. The Irvine Burns Club laid a laurel wreath on her grave.

Irvine has a 'Joan Kelly Place' within a housing scheme, named after the poet.

Poetry
As stated, Joan took an active interest in local and world events and her poetry was created around these themes. She included a poem about Robert Burns in her book. Her poetry often appeared in local papers.

In 1884 she published her poems in an octavo (17.5 x 1.5 cm) volume with the title "Miscellaneous Poems". It was published in hardback blue boards with calico covering and embossed gold lettering by Charles Murchland "Irvine Herald Office" in Irvine. Charles was President of Irvine Burns Club in 1879 and Provost of Irvine (1898-1904). She comments in the introduction to her book that "Had it not been for the kindness of my publisher, who consented to take the responsibility of launching my frail bark upon the rough sea of criticism ... " She received a letter of thanks from the Empress Eugene thanking her for the poem she wrote upon the death of her son in Africa.

A copy is recorded to be in the Queen's Sitting Room at Osborne House

The publication, "The poets of Ayrshire from the fourteenth century till the present day, with selections from their writings" includes her work and gives the following details:

"This authoress adds another to the long list of lowly minstrels belonging to Ayrshire. She was born in Irvine, and livedthere with her widowed mother until the latter was eighty-fouryears of age, when the ruthless breaker of love's more thanmortal ties divided them, and the brightest star of poor Joan'slife was extinguished forever. Left friendless and in a manner helpless, the parish authoritiesfound it necessary to remove her to their Combination Palace nearher native town, but she longed to breathe what she called " the sweet,pure air of liberty," and took unkindly to her new home. With the viewof raising funds for her self-support, a small volume of herpoems was published, but the proceeds did little more thancover publishing expenses, and the hope maintained by thepoetess that she might by these means regain her independencewas forever blasted."

The following is an example of this Victorian poet's work composed for John Yuille who died in 1883 aged 75 and published in her 1884 book. John had been a hand loom weaver who became a printer, stationer and bookseller. He was buried in the Irvine Old Parish Churchyard. His role as a friend and a publisher and printer may have influenced Joan's decision to publish her poems shortly after John's death.

Joan's poem upon the death of the wife of the Irvine area's laird;

A partial list of the poems in Kelly's 1884 publication Miscellaneous Poems 
 Lines on the Death of Miss H. Green
 Lines Upon the Sad Catastrophe on the Clyde
 In Memory of John McGavin, Esq, Kilwinning
 In Memory of the Misses R & C Wales
 On the Death of the Prince, Imperial
 Upon Receiving a Letter of Thanks From the Empress Eugenie
 To Tame a Robin
 On the Marriage of Princess Louise and the Marquis of Lorne
 Upon the Death of Prince Albert
 Child and Mother - A Dialogue
 The Seven Sailors

 Friendship
 The Poisoned Flower
 To a False Friend
 A Husband to His Wife, Before Leaving For America
 Fifty Years of Married Life; or the Golden Wedding
 Lines Upon Miss Longmuir's Marriage
 A Christmas Wish to a Lady
 Upon Looking at the Photograph of the Rev James Sommerville Irvine Parish Church
 A Sketch of the Writer's Life
 Lines on the Mournful Catastrophe in Sunderland
 Upon Burns' Birthday, 25 January 1867

References
Notes

External links
 Facebook video recital of "To Tame a Robin"

Scottish literature
1828 births
1898 deaths
People from Irvine, North Ayrshire
Scottish women poets
People of Manx descent
19th-century Scottish women writers